Dakota Avery Goyo (born August 22, 1999) is a Canadian former actor. He is best known for playing Max Kenton in the film Real Steel (2011) and Jesse Barrett in the film Dark Skies (2013). He also voices Jamie Bennett in the DreamWorks Animation film Rise of the Guardians (2012).

Personal life
Goyo was born to Debra, a former model and singer who manages his career, and David Goyo. He has two older brothers, Devon and Dallas.

Career

Goyo appeared in his first commercial as an infant, after which he landed various roles in television and animation series. His featured television work includes Disney's JoJo's Circus in 2005, Ultra in 2006, Super Why! in 2008, Murdoch Mysteries in 2008, The Listener in 2009, My Neighbor's Secret in 2009, Happy Town in 2010 and a recurring role as Timmy Tibble on the children's television series Arthur in 2010. 

Goyo completed a series lead role in the ABC pilot Solving Charlie in 2009, playing Charlie, an orphaned child who has an IQ of 190 and helps his long-lost brother, an aspiring detective, to solve crimes. Goyo played Teddy, the son of Josh Hartnett's character, in the 2007 film Resurrecting the Champ and played Timmy, grandson of Susan Sarandon's character, in the 2007 film Emotional Arithmetic. 

In 2011, Goyo starred in Real Steel as Max Kenton, the estranged son of Charlie Kenton (Hugh Jackman), and also played young Thor in the superhero film Thor. In 2012, Goyo voiced Jamie in the DreamWorks Animation feature Rise of the Guardians, and in 2013, he starred in the science fiction thriller film Dark Skies.

Filmography

Film

Television

Awards and nominations

References

External links

1999 births
Male actors from Toronto
Canadian male child actors
Canadian male film actors
Canadian male voice actors
Living people
21st-century Canadian male actors
Canadian people of Italian descent
Canadian people of Scottish descent
Canadian male television actors